Jean-Jacques Missé-Missé (born 7 August 1968) is a Cameroonian former footballer who played as a striker.

During his professional career – and not counting his native years – which spanned 13 years, he played in six countries, notably in Belgium.

Football career
Missé-Missé was born in Yaoundé. After playing in his country for hometown's Canon Sportif and Diamant, he moved to Belgium at the age of 23, first representing amateurs US Andenne-Seilles.

In 1993 Missé-Missé switched to the country's top flight, with R. Charleroi SC. In his first season, he scored a career-best 15 goals as the Zebras finished a best-ever fourth; during his three-year spell, he netted nearly 50 official goals.

Missé-Missé joined Sporting Clube de Portugal in 1996, but failed to adjust at the Lisbon side. In the following years his career faded into obscurity, as he hardly received any playing time: during the 1997–98 season he played for three clubs, including Chesterfield in England and Dundee United in Scotland (five games combined).

After a good season with Ethnikos Asteras in Greece – the club was then in the top division– Missé-Missé returned to Belgium, playing for R.A.A. Louviéroise, K.V. Oostende and KV Mechelen (nine second level goals for the latter), closing out his career at nearly 36.

See also
Dundee United F.C. season 1997–98

References

External links

Guardian Stats Centre

1968 births
Living people
Footballers from Yaoundé
Cameroonian footballers
Association football forwards
Canon Yaoundé players
Belgian Pro League players
R. Charleroi S.C. players
R.A.A. Louviéroise players
K.V. Mechelen players
Primeira Liga players
Sporting CP footballers
Süper Lig players
Trabzonspor footballers
Scottish Football League players
Dundee United F.C. players
English Football League players
Chesterfield F.C. players
Super League Greece players
Ethnikos Asteras F.C. players
Cameroon international footballers
Cameroonian expatriate footballers
Expatriate footballers in Belgium
Expatriate footballers in Portugal
Expatriate footballers in Turkey
Expatriate footballers in Scotland
Expatriate footballers in England
Expatriate footballers in Greece
Cameroonian expatriate sportspeople in Belgium
Cameroonian expatriate sportspeople in Turkey
Cameroonian expatriate sportspeople in Scotland
Cameroonian expatriate sportspeople in Greece
Diamant Yaoundé players
Cameroonian expatriate sportspeople in England